Charles O'Donnell may refer to:
 Charles James O'Donnell (1849–1934), Irish colonial administrator and politician
 Charles L. O'Donnell (1884–1934), American priest and President of the University of Notre Dame